Secondary Highway 606, commonly referred to as Highway 606, was a provincially maintained secondary highway in the Canadian province of Ontario. Highway 606 was located entirely within what is now the Municipality of Markstay-Warren in Sudbury District.

The route was established, along with many other secondary highways, in 1956 and existed until , when many other nearby secondary highways were transferred to the newly formed Regional Municipality of Sudbury, now Greater Sudbury. It is unknown why this route was removed despite not being within the region. Today, the route of Highway 606 is maintained by the Municipality of Markstay-Warren and known as Main Street.

Route description 
Highway 606 was a short  spur off Highway 17 to the nearby village of Markstay. It began at the Trans-Canada Highway, south of which a local road now known as Nepewassi Lake Road continued. Travelling north through thick forests, the route curved several times before crossing the Veuve River and the Ottawa Valley Railway. It was straight north of there as it entered into the village of Markstay, with houses on both sides of the road. Highway 606 ended at the main crossroad at Pioneer Street.

History 
Highway 606 was first assumed by the Department of Highways in 1956, along with several dozen other secondary highways. It likely existed as a township road before then.
The route remained unchanged from then until 1973, when many other secondary highways within the newly created Regional Municipality of Sudbury were decommissioned. Though it did not fall within the new region, it was decommissioned at the same time as the others.

Major intersections

References 

606
606
Roads in Sudbury District